Art-o-mat machines are repurposed cigarette vending machines that dispense cigarette pack-sized artwork.

Clark Whittington installed the first Art-o-mat at an art show in June 1997 that dispensed black & white photographs for $1.00 each.

There are over 200 machines worldwide and 400 contributing artists. In 2010, six machines were installed at the Cosmopolitan of Las Vegas.

References

External links
 Art-o-mat — official website

Vending machines